Kennet was a non-metropolitan district in Wiltshire, England. It was abolished on 1 April 2009 and replaced by Wiltshire Council.

Political control
From the first election to the council in 1973 until its abolition in 2009, political control of the council was held by the following parties:

Leadership
The leaders of the council from 2001 until the council's abolition in 2009 were:

Council elections
1973 Kennet District Council election
1976 Kennet District Council election (New ward boundaries)
1979 Kennet District Council election
1983 Kennet District Council election
1987 Kennet District Council election
1991 Kennet District Council election (District boundary changes took place but the number of seats remained the same)
1995 Kennet District Council election (District boundary changes took place but the number of seats remained the same)
1999 Kennet District Council election
2003 Kennet District Council election (New ward boundaries)
2007 Kennet District Council election

By-election results

References

 
Council elections in Wiltshire
District council elections in England